Tell Shihab (also spelled Tell esh-Shihab or Tal Shehab) is a village in southern Syria, administratively part of the Daraa Governorate, located northwest of Daraa on the Jordan-Syria border. Nearby localities include al-Shaykh Saad and Nawa to the north, Muzayrib, Da'el and Tafas to the northeast, and al-Yadudah to the east. According to the Syria Central Bureau of Statistics, Tell Shihab had a population of 9,430 in the 2004 census.

Etymology
The town's name is "purely Arabic" according to  George Adam Smith, and "Tell Shihab" is translated as "Mound of the Warrior."

History

Ancient
Tell Shihab is one of the places believed to be the site of the ancient city of Yeno'am. The location of the tell surrounded by the Yarmuk River, corresponds to the description of the town. Furthermore, a stele from Seti I, was discovered in 1900 by George Adam Smith at the tell confirming that it was one of the sites conquered by the Egyptian king during his campaigns in the region. The stele, missing the lower part, was built into the wall of a local house, and shows Seti I with Amun-Ra and Mut. Wilhelm Max Müller argued that the stela did not commemorate the victory, but rather expressed the loyalty of the dedicator to his king. Bronze Age pottery sherds were also found on the site during excavations conducted by William Foxwell Albright in 1925.

Ottoman
At the end of the 19th century, the village had 750 inhabitants and 160 houses, and was described as "blossoming".
In the early 20th-century, the sheikhs of Tell Shihab belonged to a powerful family in the area and relative prosperity of the town allowed them to accumulate large amounts of wealth. According to Smith, who visited in 1900, "nearly all the villagers look happy and comfortable."

Modern
During the current anti-government uprising in Syria, opposition rebels gained control of Tell Shihab and it has since been used as a major crossing point for Syrian refugees fleeing to Jordan. On 6 September 2012, the Syrian Army launched an assault on the town with the backing of 20 tanks, according to opposition activists. A number of houses were allegedly raided and some people were detained by the authorities.

Geography
Tell Shihab is situated on the promontory formed by the junction of Wadi al-Meddan and Wadi Tell Shihab, which represents the modern borders between Syria and Jordan. With the presence of several wadis there is an abundance of water in the town. Surrounding Tell Shihab are stretches of wheat fields.

References

Bibliography

 
Schumacher (1889): Across the Jordan; being an exploration and survey of part of Hauran and Jaulan  p 201 ff

External links
 Map of the town, Google Maps
Kafer el Ma-map; 21K

Populated places in Daraa District
Bronze Age sites in Syria
Archaeological sites in Daraa Governorate